Loving may refer to:

 Love, a range of human emotions
 Loving (surname)
 Loving v. Virginia, a 1967 landmark United States Supreme Court civil rights case

Film and television 
 Loving (1970 film), an American film
 Loving (1996 film), a British television film based on the novel by Henry Green
 Loving (2016 film), a film about the Supreme Court decision Loving v. Virginia
 Carry On Loving, a 1970 film in the Carry On series
 Loving (TV series), an American daytime soap opera

Music 
 Lovin', 2021 extended play by Ailee

Other media 
 Loving (novel), a 1945 novel by Henry Green
 Loving, a 1981 novel by Danielle Steel
 Loving, a 2010 album by Johannes Heil

Places in the United States 
 Loving, New Mexico, a village
 Loving, Oklahoma, an unincorporated community
 Loving, Texas, an unincorporated community
 Loving County, Texas, the second-least populous county in the U.S.

See also 
 Lovin, a surname
 Loving You (disambiguation)